Hans-Joachim Perk (born 19 September 1945) is a German athlete. He competed in the men's decathlon at the 1972 Summer Olympics.

References

1945 births
Living people
Athletes (track and field) at the 1972 Summer Olympics
German decathletes
Olympic athletes of West Germany
Athletes from Berlin